Echten is the name of a number of places in the Netherlands.

Echten, Drenthe
Echten, Friesland